The Church of the Ascension is a Roman Catholic parish church in the Roman Catholic Archdiocese of New York, located at 221 West 107th Street in the Manhattan Valley section of the Upper West Side of Manhattan, New York City. The parish was established in 1895.

Buildings
The elaborate midblock church, located on 107th Street between Amsterdam Avenue and Broadway, has an attached parish house, both designed in the Sicilian Romanesque of the Norman and Byzantine hybrid style and built between 1896 and 1897 to the designs by the American of German descent Roman Catholic church-building architectural firm of Schickel & Ditmars.
The parish has a four-storey brick and stone parochial school built by P. J. Brennan & Son, builders, in 1911 to designs by architect F. A. de Meuron of 31 East 27th Street for $120,000. A five-storey brick dwelling house was erected at 218 West 108th Street in 1927 to the designs by architect Robert J. Reilly of 12 E 41st Street for $100,000. The church was renovated in 1939.

Organ
The Müller & Abel organ and organ case was built in 1898. Around 1900, a used two-manual pipe organ was installed in the Lower Church. Specifications of this organ have not yet been located. During 1939 renovations of the lower church, a new two-manual pipe organ was installed in 1939 by the Aeolian-Skinner Organ Company, Inc. of Boston, Massachusetts, and replaced the Müller & Abel organ. "Sometime after 1970, the chapel was closed and the organ was removed."

Notable events
The church has been the filming location for films and television shows, including Keeping the Faith (2000) and as "Trinity Church" in the "Book of Hours" episode from the first season of White Collar (2009).

References
Notes

Bibliography

External links
Official Website
The 1897 Church of the Ascension -- 107th Street off Amsterdam
Ascension School website
Celebrating 100 Years: A Brief History of the Ascension School, 1912-2012

Roman Catholic churches completed in 1897
19th-century Roman Catholic church buildings in the United States
Religious organizations established in 1895
Roman Catholic churches in Manhattan
Romanesque Revival church buildings in New York City
Schickel & Ditmars church buildings
Upper West Side
1895 establishments in New York City